Alexandrov is the name of several inhabited localities in Russia.

Urban localities
Alexandrov, Vladimir Oblast, a town in Alexandrovsky District of Vladimir Oblast

Rural localities
Alexandrov, Oryol Oblast, a settlement in Speshnevsky Selsoviet of Korsakovsky District in Oryol Oblast
Alexandrov, Rostov Oblast, a khutor in Znamenskoye Rural Settlement of Morozovsky District in Rostov Oblast